() is the third-largest municipality in Nordland county, Norway, by population. The administrative centre of the municipality is the town of Narvik. Some of the notable villages in the municipality include Ankenesstranda, Ballangen, Beisfjord, Bjerkvik, Bjørnfjell, Elvegård, Kjøpsvik, Skjomen, Håkvik, Hergot, Straumsnes, and Vidrek. The Elvegårdsmoen army camp is located near Bjerkvik.

Narvik is located on the shores of the Ofotfjorden. The municipality is part of the traditional district of Ofoten of Northern Norway, inside the Arctic Circle. The municipality of Narvik borders the municipality of Hamarøy to the southwest, Evenes to the northwest, Bardu, Gratangen, Lavangen and Tjeldsund (in Troms og Finnmark county) to the north, and Norrbotten County (Lapland) in Sweden to the south and east.

The  municipality is the 10th largest by area out of the 356 municipalities in Norway. Narvik is the 57th most populous municipality in Norway with a population of 21,530.

General information

The municipality of Narvik was established on 1 January 1902 when the village of Narvik received status as a proper town and was separated from the large municipality of Ankenes. Initially, the town-municipality of Narvik had 3,705 residents. On 1 January 1974, the municipality of Ankenes was merged with the town-municipality of Narvik, forming a new, larger municipality of Narvik. After the merger, the new municipality of Narvik had 19,780 residents. On 1 January 1999, a small area of Narvik Municipality (population: 9) was transferred to the neighboring Evenes Municipality.

On 1 January 2020, the municipality of Narvik was merged with the neighboring Ballangen Municipality and the eastern half of Tysfjord Municipality to form a new, larger municipality of Narvik. This occurred because in 2017, the municipal government agreed to the merger and the Parliament of Norway required Tysfjord to be split up.

Coat of arms
The coat of arms was adopted on 20 June 2019 for use starting on 1 January 2020 after a municipal merger. The blazon is "Azure, a mountain peak argent". This means the arms have a blue field (background) and the charge is a mountain peak. The mountain peak has a tincture of argent which means it is commonly colored white, but if it is made out of metal, then silver is used. The arms were designed to look like the local mountain Stetind. The arms were designed by Eirik Djupvik.

The coat of arms was granted on 1 June 1951 and they were in use until 1 January 2020 when there was a municipal merger. The official blazon is "Gules, an anchor Or". This means the arms have a red field (background) and the charge is an anchor. The anchor has a tincture of Or which means it is commonly colored yellow, but if it is made out of metal, then gold is used. The anchor symbolises Narvik's status as an important port (the largest harbour in North Norway). The arms were designed by Hallvard Trætteberg.

Name
The municipality (originally the town of Narvik) is named after the old Narvik farm ( or ) since the town was built there. The two possible Old Norse roots have differing meanings. In that case, the first element comes from the old pagan god name . Both options share the same last element, which means "inlet". Historically, the name was spelled Narduigh or Narvigen.

The harbour in the town of Narvik was once called Victoriahavn after Queen Victoria of the United Kingdom, however Sweden's Crown Princess Victoria was also honoured.

History
The history of Narvik as a settlement began in the Bronze Age. Not very much is known about these people, but the Vikings lived in this area.

Narvik was developed as an all-year ice free port for the Swedish Kiruna and Gällivare iron mines. The history of modern Narvik begins in the 1870s, when the Swedish government began to understand the potential of the iron ore mines in Kiruna, Sweden. Obtaining iron ore from Kiruna had one significant problem in that there was no suitable Swedish port. The nearest Swedish port, Luleå, had limitations. It was covered with ice all winter, it is far from Kiruna, and it allows only medium-sized bulk freight vessels. The Swedish company (Gällivarre Aktiebolag) built the Iron Ore Line (Malmbanan) to Riksgränsen on the Norway–Sweden border. The Norwegian Ofotbanen railway line connects Narvik to the Swedish border.

Swedish mining corporation LKAB still ships the majority of its ore from Narvik (a total 25 million tons a year). It is an important employer and landowner in Narvik, although its influence is not as prominent as in the past.

World War II

The port of Narvik proved to be strategically valuable in the early years of World War II and the town became a focal point of the Norwegian Campaign. In 1939, Germany's war industry depended upon iron ore mined in Kiruna and Malmberget in Sweden. During the summer season, this ore could be sent by cargo ship to Germany through the Baltic Sea via the Swedish port of Luleå on the Gulf of Bothnia. However, when the Gulf of Bothnia froze during the winter, more shipments of the ore needed to be transported through Narvik and, from there, down the west coast of Norway to Germany. The town of Narvik is linked by rail to Sweden, but not to any other towns in Norway. As a result, Narvik serves as a gateway to the ore fields of Sweden that cannot be easily reached from southern Norway via land. Winston Churchill realized that the control of Narvik meant stopping most German imports of iron ore during the winter of 1940. This would be advantageous to the Allies, and it might help shorten the war. Equally as important, later in the war, German submarines and warships based there threatened the allied supply line to the Soviet Union.

Churchill proposed laying a naval minefield in Norwegian territorial waters around Narvik (referred to as "the Leads"), or else occupying the town with Allied troops. The Allies hoped that they might be able to use an occupied Narvik as a base from which to secure the Swedish ore fields and/or to send supplies and reinforcements to Finland, then fighting the Finnish Winter War with the Soviet Union. Plans to lay a minefield around Narvik or to seize the town met with debate within the British government – since both plans would mean a violation of Norway's neutrality and sovereignty.

Finally, on 8 April 1940, the British Admiralty launched Operation Wilfred, an attempt to lay anti-shipping minefields around Narvik in Norwegian territorial waters. Coincidentally, Germany launched its invasion of Norway (Operation Weserübung) on the next day. During this invasion, ten German destroyers, each carrying 200 mountain infantry soldiers, were sent to Narvik. The outdated Norwegian coastal defence ships  and  attempted to resist the invasion, but both Norwegian warships were sunk after a short and uneven battle. The Royal Navy quickly dispatched several ships to Narvik, including the battleship , and during the Battles of Narvik, the British took control of the coast, destroying the German destroyers that had brought the invasion force to Narvik, as well as other German ships in the area.

On 12 April 1940, the first convoys of Allied soldiers were sent under Major-General Pierse Joseph Mackesy to Narvik. The Admiralty urged Mackesy to conduct an assault on Narvik from the sea as soon as possible. However, Mackesy believed that the German harbour defences were too strong for such an invasion to take place. The Admiralty argued that a naval bombardment of Norway would enable the troops to land safely, but General Mackesy refused to subject Norwegian citizens to such a bombardment, and instead he chose to land his troops near Narvik and wait until the snow melted to take over the town.

Coordinated by the Norwegian General Carl Gustav Fleischer, Norwegian, French, Polish, and British forces recaptured Narvik on 28 May 1940. This is also considered the first Allied infantry victory in World War II. However, by that time, the Allies were losing the Battle of France and the evacuation from Dunkirk was underway. Since the Nazi German invasion of France had made Scandinavia largely irrelevant, and since the valuable troops assigned to Narvik were badly needed elsewhere, the Allies withdrew from Narvik on 8 June 1940 in Operation Alphabet. The same day, while operating in the Narvik area, the German battleships  and  sank the British aircraft carrier  during the withdrawal from this battle. Without support from the Allied naval task force, the Norwegians were outnumbered, and they had to lay down their arms in Norway on 10 June 1940. This was not a complete capitulation, since the Norwegians kept on fighting guerrilla operations inland.

Possession of the Ofotfjord was also important to the German Kriegsmarine (navy) since it provided a refuge for warships like the "pocket battleship"  and the battleship  outside the range (at the time) of air attacks from Scotland. Also, possibly U-boats could be based at Narvik.

Government
The municipality is governed by a municipal council of elected representatives, which in turn elect a mayor.  The municipality falls under the Ofoten District Court and the Hålogaland Court of Appeal.

The municipal council of Narvik is made up of 41 representatives that are elected to four year terms. The party breakdown of the council is as follows:

Mayors
The mayors of Narvik:

 1902-1902: Ole Martinussen 
 1903-1903: Nils Astrup 
 1904-1904: Statius Mosling 
 1905-1905: Ole Martinussen
 1906-1907: Statius Mosling 
 1908-1908: Edvard Kristiansen 
 1909-1910: Karl Kristian Høiem 
 1911-1911: Rolf Jacobsen (V)
 1912-1913: Albert Zintzen 
 1914-1921: Julius Bastian Olsen (Ap)
 1922-1922: Einar Wexelsen (V)
 1923-1927: Julius Bastian Olsen (Ap)
 1929-1930: Hans Kisen (Ap)
 1934-1940: Theodor Broch (Ap)
 1945-1945: Theodor Broch (Ap)
 1945-1949: Alfred Nilsen (Ap)
 1949-1953: Odd Finseth (Ap)
 1953-1967: Sverre Øvergård (Ap)
 1968-1973: Arne Kristian Meedby (Ap)
 1974-1979: Edgar Sneve (Ap)
 1980-1987: Roald Sandvoll (Ap)
 1988-1999: Odd G. Andreassen  (Ap)
 2000-2007: Olav Sigurd Alstad  (Ap)
 2007-2011: Karen Margrethe Kuvaas (Ap)
 2011-2015: Tore Nysæter (H)
 2015-present: Rune Edvardsen (Ap)

Geography

The municipality of Narvik covers large areas outside the town itself. Some of the other settlements in the municipality are Bjerkvik (located at the head of the Herjangsfjord), Håkvik, Beisfjord (along the Beisfjorden) and Skjomen. The eastern part, towards the border with Sweden, is dominated by mountains, and Storsteinfjellet reaches . There are also valleys and lakes, including the lakes Gautelisvatnet, Hartvikvatnet, Indre Sildvikvatnet, Iptojávri, Kjårdavatnet, Lossivatnet, Sealggajávri and Unna Guovdelisjávri.

Other fjords in Narvik include Skjomen, Beisfjorden, Herjangsfjorden, and Rombaken.

Forests cover the lower parts of the mountains (below 500 metres), but near the summits, the snow can stay most of the summer. Narvik has well prepared slopes for alpine skiing, some of which end almost in the town centre.

Climate
It is close to a humid continental climate due to a mild September.
As Narvik is  inside the arctic circle, the climate is  very mild for the latitude. The mountains surrounding the town give shelter from some of the strong winds typical for coastal areas, but the easterlies can be strong with especially strong wind gusts. 
The all-time high  was set 9 July 2014. July 2014 is warmest month on record with mean  and average daily high . The all-time low  was recorded on 1 February 1980. Coldest month on record is February 1966 with mean  and average daily low . The average date for the first overnight freeze in autumn when the low goes below  is October 13 (1981-2010).

The light varies considerably in Narvik since the sun is below the horizon from late November until mid-January; when there is only a bluish light for a few hours around noon. The mountains surrounding the town in reality extend this period from early November until the end of January. The light is often intense in March and April, with long daylight hours and snow cover since the snow melts in lowland areas in April, but stays in the mountains for several months. The "midnight sun" is above the horizon from 25 May to 20 July (57 days), and the period with continuous daylight lasts a bit longer, from approximately 10 May to the end of July, polar night from 5 December to 6 January (33 days). There is also a transitional period with twilight in the night, so it is not possible to see any stars at night from the last days of April until early August.

Economy
The town of Narvik is a commercial centre for some of the neighbouring municipalities. Narvik University College has approximately 1,200 students. There are some high-tech businesses in Narvik (among them Natech ) and the largest research institute in Northern Norway, Norut Narvik.

Narvik was one of the first areas in the world to be affected by the financial crisis of 2007–2008. It lost the equivalent of US$ million in August 2007 after it invested in Citigroup securities. As the Norwegian government refused to bail them out, Narvik was forced to implement severe budget cuts.

Recreation and tourism

Narvik has access to numerous outdoor activities. This is the best known location in northern Norway for alpine skiing.

There are lifts, and several of the slopes are floodlit. There is also a cable car to Fagernesfjellet, with a view and the possibility to walk even higher up in the mountains. Narvik Winter Festival takes place in early March. Mountain hiking is very popular in the area, and the mountain area near the Swedish border has several places of accommodation. A signed mountain bike route is also available. Wreck diving attracts divers to Narvik, as there are a lot of wrecks in or near the harbour, and more spread out in the fjord. Fishing in the fjord or in lakes and streams is a popular leisure activity. There are salmon rivers in Skjomen, Beisfjord and Bjerkvik.

Transportation

Port
The port of Narvik is ice-free and well protected from the weather. The port consists of three waterfront sections: LKAB bulk port, central port area with piers and deep-water harbor at Fagernes with intermodal facilities. Approximately  of cargo are annually shipped from the ports of Narvik. By 2015, the port had handled 1.1 billion tonnes of ore. Most of this iron ore. In 2015 the port installed a pier with 18 suction cups to moor ships, expected to save 40 minutes of mooring time. Each cup is 2x2 meters.

In 2005, the port of Narvik got status as Motorways of the Sea in the EU-system. In Norway, Oslo is the only city which has this status in addition to the town of Narvik.

Rail
A present and historical key to land transportation to Narvik is the Ofoten Line railway from northern Sweden across the mountains to this port town. Goods like iron ore shipped via this railroad make Narvik an important seaport. The railway has stops at Bjørnfjell Station, Katterat Station, Søsterbekk Station, and Narvik Station.

Because of the extreme terrain there, there are no railways northwards from Narvik or south to Bodø, Norway, which is at the northern end of the rest of Norway's rail network. However, it is possible to reach Narvik by way of an approximately twenty-hour  train journey through the Swedish rail system from Stockholm using the Iron Ore Line.

The activity related to the railway and large port facilities are still important in Narvik, and goods to and from North Norway, Sweden, and Finland are often distributed via Narvik. In the proposed project called the "Northern East West Freight Corridor" portion of the Eurasian Land Bridge, there are plans for using Narvik as a port for goods from East Asia bound for eastern North America. The reason is that the railway and ocean distances using this route are shorter than through central Europe to Western European ports.

Road
European route E6 crosses through the municipality using three bridges: Skjomen Bridge, Beisfjord Bridge and Hålogaland Bridge. There is also the Rombak Bridge used for E6 until 2018. There are road connections from Narvik across the mountains eastwards to Abisko and Kiruna, Sweden (via European route E10). One Narvik citizen lets other citizens use his Tesla cars at will.

Air

Culture
The Narvik War Museum (Narvik Krigsmuseum) covers the war years 1940–1945. The museum displays the Victoria Cross awarded posthumously to Captain Bernard Warburton-Lee of the British Royal Navy and a rare German Enigma coding machine.

Museum Nord - Narvik tells of the development of the ice-free harbour of Narvik and the rapid transformation of the town over the past century. The building that houses Museum Nord - Narvik was erected in 1902 as the head office of the Norwegian state railway company, Norges statsbaner and was designed by architect, Paul Due.

Churches
The Church of Norway has four parishes within the municipality of Narvik. It is part of the Ofoten prosti (deanery) in the Diocese of Sør-Hålogaland.

In Popular Culture 
Narvik appeared in Battlefield V, a First-person shooter video game, based on WWII. The map's setting, in Narvik, specifically depicts the Allied landings at the city on the 28th of May. The setting's location, depicts a snowy, mountainside battlefield, featuring tanks, planes, and infantry. the playable area includes the rail yard, loading bay, town, and ore deposit. 

Narvik is a Norwegian historical film directed by Erik Skjoldbjaerg  It stars Kristine Hartgen, Carl Martin Eggsbø, Cristoph Gelfert Mathiesen and Henrik Mestad. The film was released worldwide on Netflix in January 2023. The film featured as the Top 10 films on Netflix Canada in the month of January as of January 27, 2023.

Notable people 

 Theodor Broch (1904–1998) a lawyer and politician, Mayor of Narvik 1934 to 1946, except during WWII
 Helge Mehre MBE DSO DFC (1911–1997) a Norwegian military officer
 Fredrik Kiil (1921–2015) a Norwegian physician, improved the artificial kidney
 Cissi Klein (1929 in Narvik – 1943 in Auschwitz) a Norwegian Jewish girl, victim of the Holocaust
 Dr. Jan Paulsen (born 1935) a Seventh-day Adventist Church leader, past president of the General Conference of Seventh-day Adventists
 Jack Berntsen (1940–2010) a Norwegian philologist, songwriter and folk singer
 Thorgeir Stubø (1943–1986) a jazz musician and composer, had a family of jazz musicians 
 Terje Bjørklund (born 1945) a jazz pianist and composer
 Gro Brækken (born 1952) a businessperson, has chaired several public bodies
 Lise Haavik (born 1962) a Danish/Norwegian singer, sang at the 1986 Eurovision Song Contest
 Anne Rydning (born 1965) Colonel in the Norwegian army, the first female Army chief in Afghanistan
 Vibeke Larsen (born 1971 in Vassdalen) a Norwegian Sami politician

Sport 
 Per Willy Guttormsen (born 1942) a former speed skater, competed in the 1964, 1968 and 1972 Winter Olympics 
 Thomas Hafstad (born 1974) a retired Norwegian footballer, 239 games for Tromsø IL
 Ragnhild Gulbrandsen (born 1977) a journalist and former football striker with 80 caps for Norway
 Marit Røsberg Jacobsen (born 1994) a Norwegian handball player

Twin towns – sister cities

Narvik is twinned with:

 Kikinda, Serbia
 Kingisepp, Russia
 Kiruna, Sweden
 Nowy Sącz, Poland
 Rovaniemi, Finland

References

External links

Municipal fact sheet from Statistics Norway 
Museum Nord Official Website
Narvik Krigsmuseum Official Website

 Destination Narvik – tourist information 

 
Municipalities of Nordland
Ski areas and resorts in Norway
Populated places of Arctic Norway
1902 establishments in Norway